Molière's company (La Troupe de Molière) was the theatrical company which formed around Molière from 1648 onwards, when he was performing in the French provinces after the failure of the Illustre Théâtre in 1645. In 1658 the company moved to Paris and, after a successful performance on 24 October 1658 in front of Louis XIV at the Louvre, was allowed to share the large hall in the Hôtel du Petit-Bourbon with the Italian players of Tiberio Fiorillo. At this time Molière's company became known as the Théâtre de Monsieur, since their official sponsor was the King's  brother Philippe, Duke of Orléans, known as Monsieur. When the Petit Bourbon was demolished in 1660 to make way for the eastern expansion of the Louvre, Molière's troupe was allowed to use the abandoned Théâtre du Palais-Royal. The latter theatre had originally been built by Cardinal Richelieu in 1641. After Molière's death in 1673, his widow Armande Béjart and the actor La Grange kept the remnants of the company together, merging with the players from the Théâtre du Marais and moving to the Théâtre de Guénégaud. In 1680 the troupe of the Hôtel de Bourgogne joined the players at the Guénégaud, giving birth to the Comédie-Française.

Provinces

Paris

In 1680, by order of Louis XIV of France, the troupe at the Hôtel de Bourgogne merged into those already gathered by Molière and the Théâtre du Marais. The larger company allowed daily shows, and even to play to the court and to the city on the same day. Thus the Comédie-Française was born.

Actors
By date of joining the troupe:

Repertoire
The company's repertoire was not mainly comic. In 1659, its first full year based in Paris, it put on (grouped by genre) the following plays, seemingly its provincial repertoire too:

Tragedy
It is notable there are more tragedies than comedies in the repertoire.
 Alcionée, by Pierre Du Ryer
 Le Cid, by Pierre Corneille
 Cinna, by Pierre Corneille
 Héraclius, by Pierre Corneille
 Horace, by Pierre Corneille
 Marianne, by Tristan L'Hermite
 La Mort de Crispe, by François de Grenaille
 La Mort de Pompée, by Pierre Corneille
 Oreste et Pilade, by François-Joseph de Chancel
 Rodogune, by Pierre Corneille
 Scévole, by Pierre du Ryer
 Venceslas, by Jean Rotrou
 Zénobie, by Jean Magnon

Tragi-comedy
 Don Bertrand de Cabrère, by Jean Rotrou

Comedy
 Le Campagnard, by Gillet de La Tessonerie
 La Folle Gageure, by François Le Métel de Boisrobert
 L’Héritier ridicule, by Paul Scarron
 Don Japhet d’Arménie, by Paul Scarron
 Jodelet ou le Maître valet, by Paul Scarron
 Jodelet prince, by Thomas Corneille
 Le Gouvernement de Sancho Pansa, by Guyon Guérin de Bouscal
 Le Médecin malgré lui, by Molière
 Le Menteur, by Pierre Corneille
 Les Visionnaires, by Desmarets de Saint-Sorlin.

Farce
It is also noteworthy that there are only three works by Molière himself in the company's repertoire at this point, though by 1673 30 of its 90 play repertoire were by him (many inspired by the comedies above).
 Gros-René écolier, by Molière
 Le Médecin volant, by Molière

Sources
 Henry Lyonnet, Dictionnaire des comédiens français, Bibliothèque de la revue Universelle Internationale Illustrée, Paris et Genève, 1902–1908
 Pierre Larousse, Grand Dictionnaire Universel du XIXe siecle 
 Théâtre complet de Molière, Le Livre de poche.

Notes

Theatre companies in France
1648 establishments in France
1680 disestablishments